Lo Chuen Tsung also known as Lo Chuen Chung, (born 8 October 1963) is a Hong Kong former table tennis player.

Career 
In table tennis, Lo was one of the top players in the world in the 1980s, reaching a No. 7 ranking in 1985.

Lo played at the 1988, 1992, and 1996 Summer Olympics. He was originally from mainland China.

Lo won a bronze medal at the 1985 World Table Tennis Championships in the men's singles.

See also
 List of table tennis players
 List of World Table Tennis Championships medalists

References

Hong Kong male table tennis players
Olympic table tennis players of Hong Kong
Table tennis players at the 1996 Summer Olympics
Table tennis players at the 1992 Summer Olympics
Table tennis players at the 1988 Summer Olympics
Table tennis players from Guangdong
Table tennis players at the 1986 Asian Games
Table tennis players at the 1990 Asian Games
Table tennis players at the 1994 Asian Games
Living people
1963 births
World Table Tennis Championships medalists
Asian Games competitors for Hong Kong